Play of Daniel is a 1961 Australian TV play based on Play of Daniel. It was broadcast from the crypt of St Mary's Cathedral in Sydney.

The performance was edited by Noah Greenberg with narration by W.H. Auden.

Australian TV drama was relatively rare at the time.

Plot
In Babylon at the time of King Belshazzar, writing on the wall warns the prophet Daniel about the destruction that will accompany the arrival of Darius, leader of the Medes and the Persians. The counsellor turns King Darius against Daniel.

Cast
Richard Connolly as Daniel
Stewart Ogilvie as Prince 
John Brosnan as Darius
James Condon as Narrator
Anne Della-Bosca as Queen
Robert Moore as Belshazzar
Robyn Hannon
John Robertson

Production
The play, directed by James Lang, was presented at St Mary's Crypt in August 1961 by the Guild of St Pius X. The production was revived in November.

The ABC decided to do a live broadcast of the play which aired in December 1961. The play was set entirely to music.

See also
List of television plays broadcast on Australian Broadcasting Corporation (1960s)

References

External links

Australian drama television films
1960s Australian television plays
1961 television films
1961 drama films
1961 films